The Progressive Conservative Party of New Brunswick held a leadership election in 1991 to replace its outgoing leader Barbara Baird Filliter. The winner was former Moncton mayor and member of parliament Dennis Cochrane, who later also won the riding of Petitcodiac in the 1991 general election.

The candidates were Cochrane and St. Andrews mayor and teacher Bev Lawrence.  Fredericton—York—Sunbury member of parliament Bud Bird and party president Emilien LeBreton were also expected to run but did not enter the race.

Results

References 

1991 elections in Canada
Progressive Conservative Party of New Brunswick leadership elections
1991 in New Brunswick
Progressive Conservative Party of New Brunswick leadership election